Thomas Duffield (1492/93 – 1579), of East Grinstead, Sussex, was an English politician.

Family
Duffield was born in East Grinstead, and lived there until his death. He married a woman named Alice, and they had two sons and at least one daughter.

Career
He was a Member (MP) of the Parliament of England for East Grinstead in November 1554.

References

1493 births
1579 deaths
People from East Grinstead
English MPs 1554–1555